Kilchattan Chapel (St Cathan's Chapel) is a ruined medieval chapel near Ardminish, Isle of Gigha, Argyll and Bute, Scotland. Built in the 13th century, the chapel was dedicated to St. Cathan.

Notes

References
Newton, Norman. Kintyre, David & Charles, 2008.

External links

Churches in Argyll and Bute
Ruins in Argyll and Bute
Isle of Gigha
Church ruins in Scotland
13th-century establishments in Scotland
Buildings and structures completed in the 13th century